Vameș may refer to:
 Vameș, a village in the Piscu commune of Romania
 Vameș, a tributary of the river Geru in Romania